Dicranoweisia crispula, the mountain pincushion, is a species of mosses that lives at both poles. It grows in the South Shetland Islands and on the Antarctic Peninsula.

References

The Antarctic mosses: with special reference to the South Shetland Islands

Bryopsida
Flora of Antarctica